Estrella is an unincorporated community in Alamosa County, Colorado, United States.

Description
Estrella is a name derived from Spanish meaning "star".

See also

References

External links

Unincorporated communities in Alamosa County, Colorado
Unincorporated communities in Colorado